Giulia Martinelli (born 16 June 1991) is an Italian long-distance runner and steeplechase runner.

Career
In 2012 despite having obtained the standard (both IAAF and FIDAL), for participation in the London 2012 Olympic Games, she was excluded from the team for technical choice by Italian Athletics Federation.

Achievements
Senior

See also
 Italian all-time top lists – 3000 m steeplechase
 Italy at the 2012 European Athletics Championships
 Italy at the 2013 Mediterranean Games
 Athletics at the 2012 Summer Olympics – Qualification

References

External links
 

1991 births
Athletics competitors of Gruppo Sportivo Forestale
Athletics competitors of Centro Sportivo Carabinieri
Italian female steeplechase runners
Italian female long-distance runners
Living people
Sportspeople from the Province of Rieti